Jack Gatton Keller (June 22, 1922 – May 2, 2012) was an American professional basketball player. He played for the Fort Wayne Zollner Pistons in the National Basketball League for two seasons and averaged 2.0 points per game.

References

1922 births
2012 deaths
United States Army personnel of World War II
American men's basketball players
Basketball players from Fort Wayne, Indiana
Fort Wayne Zollner Pistons players
Forwards (basketball)
Guards (basketball)